Carex collinsii, common name  Collins' sedge, is a species of Carex native to North America. It is listed as a special concern species and believed extirpated in Connecticut. It is listed as endangered in New York, as threatened in Pennsylvania, and its historical range included Rhode Island.

References

collinsii
Flora of North America